Shifeng District is one of four urban districts of Zhuzhou City, Hunan province, China. It is named after the Shifeng Park, which lies on the south of the district and the northern bank of the Xiang River.

Located in the north western region of the city proper and on the northern shoreside of the Xiang River, the district is bordered to the north by Yuhua District of Changsha and Liuyang City, to the east by Hetang and Lusong Districts, across the Xiang river to the south by Tianyuan District, to the west by Yuetang District of Xiangtan. The district has 6 subdistricts and a town under its jurisdiction.

Administrative divisions
After an adjustment of township-level divisions of Shifeng District on 26 November 2015, Shifeng District has 6 subdistricts and a town under its jurisdiction. they are:

6 subdistricts
 Tianxin
 Xiangshiling
 Qingshuitang
 Jinglong
 Tongtangwan
 Xuelin

1 town
 Yuntian

References

www.xzqh.org 

County-level divisions of Hunan
Zhuzhou